Karvaneh may refer to:
Karvaneh, Hamadan
Karvaneh-ye Olya, Kermanshah Province
Karvaneh-ye Sofla, Kermanshah Province
Karvaneh-ye Vosta, Kermanshah Province
Karvaneh, Lorestan